Lorient South Brittany Airport or Aéroport de Lorient Bretagne Sud , also known as Lorient-Lann-Bihoué Airport, is the airport serving the city of Lorient. It is situated 5 km west-northwest of Lorient, a commune of the Morbihan département in the Brittany region of France.

Airlines and destinations 
The following airline operates regular scheduled and charter flights at Lorient Airport:

Statistics

Military use
The airport is comparatively large, 3 km by 3 km, which is due to its being built during the Second World War to support German submarine operations from the nearby base in Lorient.

It is also known as Lann Bihoue Naval Air Base (Base Aéronavale de Lann Bihoué) and is one of the French Naval Aviation bases, currently hosting:
 Flottille 4F with Grumman E-2C Hawkeye 
 Flottille 21F with Atlantique 2
 Flottille 23F with Atlantique 2
 Flottille 24F with Falcon 50 M 
 Flottille 28F with Embraer Xingu

These units also form the airwing which is assigned to the aircraft carrier Charles de Gaulle.

Accidents
On July 30, 1998, Proteus Airlines Flight 706 collided with a Cessna after flying off-course on approach to the airport, leading to the deaths of the people on both planes.

References

External links 
Base Aeronavale Lann Bihoue
Lorient South Brittany Airport (official site) 
Aéroport de Lorient-Bretagne Sud (Union des Aéroports Français) 

Airports in Brittany
Lorient
Buildings and structures in Morbihan